Janamanchi Seshadri Sarma (1882–1950) was a Telugu poet from Cuddapah, Andhra Pradesh.

Life

Janamanchi Seshadri Sarma was born in 1882 at Kaluvai in Nellore district. He took up a job in Cuddapah, but later moved to different places like Kashi, Vijayanagaram and Kasimkota near Anakapalli. He was learned in many shastras. He worked as Telugu pandit at many high schools, retiring finally from Municipal High School, Cuddapah.

Janamanchiseetharama sharma DWIVEDI 90009 44333

Honours
He earned several titles like 'Balasaraswathi', 'Abhinava Nannaparya', 'Abhinava Andhra Valmiki', 'Andhra Vyasa', Kalaprapoorna, 'Kavyathirtha', etc. and was a recipient of several honours.

He was honoured with Kalaprapoorna from Andhra University in 1937.

Literary works

Translations
Seshadri Sarma translated the following works from Sanskrit into Telugu. In his translations he took care that the original idea was faithfully reproduced in Telugu. His style was simple and straight and he avoided lengthy phrases and long-winding sentences.

Halasya mahatmyam
Brahmanda Puranam
Brahma Puranam
Valmiki Ramayanam (Translated as Andhra Srimadramayanam),
The tenth canto of Bhagavata Purana (Translated as Tandavakrishna Bhagavatam)
Kaumarika khandam and Arunachala khandam from Skandapuranam

Original works

Srimadandhra Lalitopakhyanam
Hanumadvijaya
Sarvamangala Parinayam
Dharmasara Ramayanam
Kalivilasam
Satpravartnamu
Sri Ramavatara Tatvamu
Sri Krishnavatara Tatvamu
Tandlata
Vanajakshi

There are also a number of unpublished works to his credit like Pandavajnatam, Vichitra paduka pattabhishekam, Shrirama vanavasam.

Notes
20th Century luminaries, Potti Sreeramulu Telugu University, Hyderabad, 2005.

Telugu poets
1882 births
1950 deaths
20th-century Indian poets
Indian male poets
People from Kadapa district
Poets from Andhra Pradesh
20th-century Indian male writers
Poets in British India